Dinosaur Britain is a two-part British documentary on ITV telling the story of many of the dinosaurs that once roamed Great Britain, revealing how they hunted, what they ate and how they died from the evidence revealed from their bones. Presenter Ellie Harrison teams up with young paleontologist Dean Lomax in order to depict different species of dinosaurs set to the backdrop of modern Britain.

Episodes

See also
Before We Ruled the Earth
Dinosaur Planet
Dinosaur Revolution
Paleoworld
Planet Dinosaur
Valley of the T-Rex
When Dinosaurs Roamed America

External links
  ITV press pack

2015 British television series debuts
2015 British television series endings
2010s British documentary television series
Documentary television series about dinosaurs
ITV documentaries
2010s British television miniseries
Television series by All3Media
English-language television shows